Perfetto ( English: "Perfect") is the thirteenth studio album by Italian singer-songwriter Eros Ramazzotti, released by Universal Music on 12 May 2015.

Track listing

Credits 

 A&R - Fausto Donato
 Producer - Eros Ramazzotti, Claudio Guidetti
 Recording Engineer - Mike Tacci
 Tape Machine/Pro Tools Operator - Marco Sonzini
 Vocal Engineer/Overdub Engineer - Claudio Guidetti
 Keyboard Engineer, Overdub Engineer, Pro-Tools, Vocal Engineer - Davide Tagliapietra
 Studio Assistant - Miguel Lara, Michael Peterson, Pat Simonini
 Mixing Engineer - Pino 'Pinaxa' Pischetola
 Mastering Engineer - Antonio Baglio
 Executive Producer - Saverio Principini
 Executive Production Coordinator - Marco Sorrentino
 Photography - Toni Thorimbert
 Artwork - Flora Sala
 Composer - Eros Ramazzotti, Francesco Bianconi, Gino 'Pacifico' De Crescenzo, Claudio Guidetti, Gary Kemp, Federico Zampaglione

Charts

Weekly charts

Year-end charts

Certifications

References

Eros Ramazzotti albums
2015 albums
Italian-language albums
Spanish-language albums